Narasimharaja is one of the 224 constituencies in the Karnataka Legislative Assembly of Karnataka a south state of India. It is a segment of Mysore Lok Sabha constituency.

Members of Legislative Assembly
 1967: Azeez Sait, Samyukta Socialist Party
 1972: Azeez Sait, Indian National Congress
 1978: Azeez Sait, Indian National Congress (Indira)
 1983: Azeez Sait, Janata Party
 1985: Mukthar Unnisa, Indian National Congress
 1989: Azeez Sait, Indian National Congress
 1994: Maruthirao Pawar, Bharatiya Janata Party
 1999: Azeez Sait, Indian National Congress
 2002 (By-Poll): Tanveer Sait, Indian National Congress
 2004: Tanveer Sait, Indian National Congress
 2008: Tanveer Sait, Indian National Congress
 2013: Tanveer Sait, Indian National Congress
 2018: Tanveer Sait, Indian National Congress

See also
 Mysore
 Mysore district
 Mysore Lok Sabha constituency
 List of constituencies of Karnataka Legislative Assembly

References

 

Assembly constituencies of Karnataka
Mysore district